Reto Keller (born 4 June 1994 in Münsingen) is a Swiss curler from Bern.

Keller threw fourth stones for the Swiss junior team (skipped by Yannick Schwaller) at the 2014 World Junior Curling Championships, winning a gold medal. Keller was invited to be the alternate on the Swiss team at the 2015 World Junior Curling Championships. The team won a silver medal, though Keller didn't play in any matches.

In 2014, Keller joined the Pfister rink. The team played in a number of World Curling Tour events, and would win the Swiss Men's Curling Championship in 2015. They represented Switzerland at the 2015 Ford World Men's Curling Championship, finishing in 7th place.

References

External links
 

Living people
1994 births
Swiss male curlers
People from Münsingen
Sportspeople from Bern